The  (lit. West Fuji Road) is a 4-laned toll road in Shizuoka Prefecture, Japan. It is owned and managed by Central Nippon Expressway Company. It is a bypass of National Route 139.

Route description
Officially, the road is designated as a bypass for National Route 139.

The road connects the cities of Fuji and Fujinomiya in Shizuoka Prefecture. In Fuji, the road connects directly to an interchange with the Tōmei Expressway and follows a northeasterly course to Fujinomiya.

Tolls are collected at a toll plaza near the northern terminus in Fujinomiya. The toll for a regular passenger car is 200 yen. Electronic Toll Collection (ETC) is accepted for payment, however no discount programs are in effect. Since there are no toll collection points between Fuji Interchange and Hiromi Interchange this section of the road is effectively free.

History
The Nishi-Fuji Road opened on 2 April 1982. On 14 April 2012, the road received another junction with the newly built Shin-Tōmei Expressway.

Junction list
The entire toll road is in Shizuoka Prefecture.

|colspan="8" style="text-align: center;"|Roadway continues as Shizuoka Prefecture Route 353 (Tagourakō Fuji Inter Route)

|colspan="8" style="text-align: center;"|Roadway continues as

References

External links
Central Nippon Expressway Company

Toll roads in Japan
Roads in Shizuoka Prefecture